Crossostylis is a genus of trees in the family Rhizophoraceae.

Species
 Crossostylis grandiflora Pancher ex Brongn. & Gris
 Crossostylis multiflora Brongn. & Gris ex Pancher & Sebert
 Crossostylis sebertii Pancher ex Brongn. & Gris

References

Rhizophoraceae
Malpighiales genera